Metallinos is a Greek name and may refer to:

 Sculptor Aristedes Metallinos
 Protopresbyter (Archpriest) Fr. George Metallinos